Kouvola Town hall is the seat of municipal government of City of Kouvola, Finland. The building was designed by architect Juha Leiviskä together with Bertel Saarnio, and completed in 1968. It is considered to be the breakthrough work of Juha Leiviskä. DOCOMOMO Finland working party has included Kouvola Town Hall on its list of important architectural and environmental sites. In 2017 Kouvola Town Hall was voted by Iltalehti readers as the most handsome city hall in Finland.

Main hall of Kouvola town hall is one of the two home concert halls of Kymi Sinfonietta.

References

Government buildings completed in 1968
Juha Leiviskä buildings
Buildings and structures in Kouvola
City and town halls in Finland
Modernist architecture in Finland